Maya Bozhidarova Manolova (born 4 May 1965) is a Bulgarian politician and the leader of the political movement Stand Up.BG, part of the Stand Up! Mafia, get out! coalition. She was formerly the vice-chairperson as well as a deputy in the Bulgarian National Assembly, as well National Ombudsman of Bulgaria.

Biography 
Manolova was born on 4 May 1965 in Kyustendil. She attended the Soviet Komsomol University in Moscow and for 2 years she attended courses in Law and Economics at the Bulgarian University of National and World Economy, as well as completing a specialty program in social management. Manolova was a registered attorney in her home town of Kyustendil from 1998 to 2015.

Political career

Member and Deputy Chairperson of the National Assembly 
She became a member of Bulgaria's National Assembly, representing the Bulgarian Socialist Party in August 2005, taking part in numerous parliamentary commissions.

In 2008, she took control of the Socialist Party's Kyustendil branch.

Following the 2013 Bulgarian parliamentary election, she was elected as Deputy Speaker of Bulgaria's national assembly. She lost that position after her party's exit from government following the 2014 Bulgarian parliamentary election, but was reеlected as a member of the National Assembly for another term. Upon the resignation of Sergey Stanishev as party chair in July 2014, she unsuccessfully participated in the Socialist Party leadership election, placing fifth with the support of 83 delegates.

Ombudsman 
Manolova was appointed as Ombudsman of Bulgaria by the National Assembly on 20 October 2015. Even though the ruling GERB party, her socialist party's largest rival, initially rejected her candidacy, it eventually voted in its favour after all of the other parliamentary groups in the national assembly announced their support for it. She left the Socialist Party in order to take up her new position, as Bulgarian law doesn't allow the ombudsman to be a member of a political party.

Manolova was extremely active during her tenure as Ombudsman, helping push through several landmark laws as she positioned herself as a "defender of the little people", which made her very popular among the Bulgarian public. By early 2019, she was one of the only two Bulgarian politicians (the other being President Rumen Radev) with an approval rating above 50%. She resigned as Ombudsman in early September 2019, citing "systematic neglect of the ombudsman institution" and a "lack of political will" by the National Assembly, as well as her intention to run for Mayor of Sofia, Bulgaria's capital and largest city.

Candidate for Mayor of Sofia 
After resigning as Ombudsman, she entered into the race for Mayor of Sofia in the 2019 Bulgarian local elections as an independent candidate without a formal affiliation to a political party. Nevertheless, the Sofia branch of the Bulgarian Socialist Party decided to support and formally endorse her candidacy several days later on 11 September. Her candidacy was deemed as the first serious left-wing challenge for the position of Mayor of Sofia since the end of the socialist period, as following the end of that period Sofia was typically seen as a very safe election for GERB and a stronghold of centre-right and right-wing politics.

Following the first round of the election Manolova secured a runoff round, in which she faced longstanding Mayor of Sofia Yordanka Fandakova from Bulgaria's ruling GERB party. Although her opponent Fandakova failed to secure a majority of votes even on the second round of the election, she was nevertheless elected as Mayor of Sofia, as she managed a lead over Manolova by about 4% of the vote.

Manolova expressed doubts as to the fairness of the election, expressing the opinion that "the entirety of the Bulgarian underground had been mobilized" to swing the election in favour of her opponent.

A week after the vote, Manolova officially filed a motion before the Bulgarian judiciary for the election in Sofia to be annulled and rerun, presenting 14 folders of what she dubbed as evidence of "heavy violations" of Bulgaria's electoral code and law, which she deemed had undermined the fairness of the election and skewed its result.

In addition, she filed another civil lawsuit for 15,000 Bulgarian lev against Bulgarian Prime Minister and GERB leader Boyko Borisov personally. She accused Borisov of "false" and "defamatory" comments due to a statement he made in a television interview in the run-up to the second round of the election, in which he accused her of illegally buying votes from Romani in one of Sofia's districts. She pledged that if granted, she would donate all of the proceeds to fund the construction of a children's playground in that district.

Political project 

In late 2019, following Sofia's Mayoral election, Manolova launched a political project dubbed Stand Up.BG, which she stated would not become a political party or affiliate itself to such, but would leverage political demands against Bulgaria's government. She stated that she would not run for leadership of Bulgaria's Socialist Party, nor for President of Bulgaria, and would instead dedicate her work to her new project. She described the project as a "civic platform" on a national scale, which would aim to coordinate actions of individual citizens and NGOs to "fight against monopolies and overconstruction and for living wages, a fair business environment, the lessing of the administrative burden on citizens and the securing of fair elections". 

After the April 2021 Bulgarian parliamentary elections, the coalition which she led, Stand up! Mafia, get out!, was part of the 45th Bulgarian National Assembly. During this National Assembly Manolova headed a parliamentary commission which revised the 11-year rule of GERB.

Personal life 
Manolova was married to Milen Manolov, a customs officer from her home town. She had one daughter from this marriage. She divorced him in 2007. She married Angel Naidenov, a politician from the Socialist Party, on 2 October 2016. Manolova speaks English and Russian in addition to her native Bulgarian.

References 

Bulgarian Socialist Party politicians
21st-century Bulgarian women politicians
21st-century Bulgarian politicians
Members of the National Assembly (Bulgaria)
20th-century Bulgarian lawyers
1965 births
Living people
People from Kyustendil
Bulgarian women lawyers
University of National and World Economy alumni
Karl Marx Higher Institute of Economics alumni
Ombudsmen in Bulgaria
21st-century Bulgarian lawyers